The Grand Duchy of Moscow-Volga Bulgars War of 1376  was organized by Russian Prince Dmitry Donskoy of Moscow, and Dmitry Konstantinovich of Vladimir-Suzdal. The Moscow-Nizhny Novgorod combined army was led by Moscow Governor Dmitry Mikhailovich Bobrok Volynskyy, and sons Dmitry Suzdal Vasily and Ivan.

Background
In 1364, ongoing raids perpetrated by the Mongol-Tatars on Nizhny Novgorod land forced Prince Dmitry Konstantinovich of Nizhegorodsko-Suzdal to ally with and seek assistance from Dmitri Ivanovich of Moscow. Certain outposts for these raids served the Bulgar Khanate.

Campaign
During the campaign, many villages in Volga Bulgaria were burned and large numbers were slaughtered.

On March 16, the Russian army invaded Volga Bulgaria, leading Hasan Khan to mount a defense. The Bulgars rode camels at this time. The city walls were breached by Russian fire-power. However, according to the chronicler, Russian forces were also under heavy assault and faced significant opposition. Once the walls were breached, the Bulgar army forces were quickly defeated. Many Bulgars fled into the city and hid behind the walls. Hasan Khan ordered a 5,000 ruble payment (2,000 to soldiers and 3,000 to princes and magistrates) to end the attack.

References

Wars involving Russia
Wars of the Middle Ages
Warfare of the Early Modern period
14th century in the Grand Duchy of Moscow
1370s conflicts
Vladimir-Suzdal
Volga Bulgaria
Conflicts in 1376
1376 in Europe